Wig is a 2019 documentary film by Chris Moukarbel about Wigstock, which premiered at the Tribeca Film Festival and later was telecasted on HBO on June 18, 2019.

Summary

Spotlighting the art of drag and centered on the New York staple Wigstock, Wig showcases the personalities and performances that influence the way that people understand queerness, art and identity in today's world.
The film juxtaposes present-day footage with archival footage from previous editions of Wigstock and home videos. It charts the journey of drag which has gone from being clandestine to being part of mainstream pop culture.

Lady Bunny and RuPaul performed at the Pyramid Club (New York City) in the 1980s.

Bianca Del Rio and Sherry Vine appeared at the 2018 Wigstock.

Neil Patrick Harris performed Hedwig and the Angry Inch at the 2018 Wigstock.

Cast
Actresses are themselves.

Charlene Incarnate
Lady Bunny
Linda Simpson
Naomi Smalls
Willam Belli
Flotilla Debarge
Lady Quesa'Dilla
Kevin Aviance
Neil Patrick Harris

See also
Wigstock: The Movie

References

External links

2019 documentary films
2019 LGBT-related films
2019 films
American LGBT-related films
Drag (clothing)-related films
HBO documentary films
2010s American films